Imam Mahmudi (born 9 April 1994) is an Indonesian professional footballer who plays as a defender for Liga 2 club PSMS Medan.

Club career

PSS Sleman
He was signed for PSS Sleman to play in Liga 1 in the 2021 season. Mahmudi made his league debut on 2 January 2022 in a match against Persik Kediri at the Kapten I Wayan Dipta Stadium, Gianyar.

PSMS Medan
Mahmudi was signed for PSMS Medan to play in Liga 2 in the 2022–23 season. He made his league debut on 22 September 2022 in a match against PSPS Riau at the Riau Main Stadium, Riau.

Career statistics

Club

References

External links
 Imam Mahmudi at Soccerway
 Imam Mahmudi at Liga Indonesia

1994 births
Living people
Indonesian footballers
Persiba Balikpapan players
PSS Sleman players
PSMS Medan players
Liga 2 (Indonesia) players
Liga 1 (Indonesia) players
People from Kediri (city)
Sportspeople from East Java
Association football defenders